Dashadi Station, formerly Gangwanlu Station during planning, is a station on  Line 5 of the Guangzhou Metro. It is located underground the junction of West Dashadi Road and Gangwan Road, in the Huangpu District of Guangzhou, near Huangpu Police Station, Dashadi Shopping City and Huangpu Commercial City. It opened in December 2009.

Station layout

Exits

References

Railway stations in China opened in 2009
Guangzhou Metro stations in Huangpu District